The following is a list of centaurs, a group of non-resonant small Solar System bodies whose orbit around the Sun lie typically between the orbits of Jupiter and Neptune (5 to 30 AU). Centaurs are minor planets with characteristics of comets, and often classified as such. The dynamical group is formed due to Neptune's eroding effect on the Kuiper belt by means of gravitational scattering, sending objects inward to become centaurs, or outward to become scattered-disc objects, or removing them from the Solar System entirely. Centaurs themselves have unstable orbits with short lifetimes, transitioning from the inactive population of Kuiper belt objects to the active group of Jupiter-family comets within a few million years.

List 

The list of centaurs is compiled from MPC's MPCORB data file based on criteria defined by the JPL-SBDB, and completed with objects from the List of Known Trans-Neptunian Objects and The Deep Ecliptic Survey Object Classifications. by William Johnston and Marc Buie, respectively. , this table contains 928 objects. A dedicated column for each of these sources inidcates whether an object is considered to be a centaur or not. The table highlights red and grey centaurs with a distinct background color (see legend).
 Legend

See also 
 List of trans-Neptunian objects
 List of damocloids
 Unusual minor planet

Notes

References

External links 
 The Dynamics of Known Centaurs, Matthew S. Tiscareno and Renu Malhotra
 The Deep Ecliptic Survey: A Search For Kuiper Belt Objects and Centaurs, J. L. Elliot

Centaurs
Centaurs
Centaurs